Prentis is a surname. People with this surname include:

 Dave Prentis (born 1950), British trade unionist, General Secretary 2001–present
 Edward Prentis (1797–1854), English genre painter
 John Prentis, mayor of Williamsburg, Virginia from 1759 to 1760
 Joseph Prentis (1754–1809, American politician, Speaker of the Virginia House of Delegates 1786–88
 Robert R. Prentis (1855–1931), American lawyer, 16th Chief Justice of Virginia 1926–31
 Victoria Prentis, British Conservative Party politician, Member of Parliament (MP) for Banbury since 2015